The women's 10,000 metres event at the 1997 European Athletics U23 Championships was held in Turku, Finland, on 13 July 1997.

Medalists

Results

Final
13 July

Participation
According to an unofficial count, 12 athletes from 10 countries participated in the event.

 (1)
 (1)
 (1)
 (1)
 (1)
 (2)
 (1)
 (2)
 (1)
 (1)

References

10000 metres
10,000 metres at the European Athletics U23 Championships